Svenska Cupen 1944 was the fourth season of the main Swedish football Cup. The competition was concluded on 1 October 1944 with the Final, held at Råsunda Stadium, Solna in Stockholms län. Malmö FF won 4-3 against IFK Norrköping (after extra time) before an attendance of 35,087 spectators.

Preliminary round 1

For other results see SFS-Bolletinen - Matcher i Svenska Cupen.

Preliminary round 2

For other results see SFS-Bolletinen - Matcher i Svenska Cupen.

First round

For other results see SFS-Bolletinen - Matcher i Svenska Cupen.

Second round
The 8 matches in this round were played on 16 July 1944.

Quarter-finals
The 4 matches in this round were played on 23 July 1944.

Semi-finals
The semi-finals in this round were played on 27 August 1944.

Final
The final was played on 1 October 1944 at the Råsunda Stadium.

Footnotes

References 

1944
Cup
Sweden